John Grimshaw may refer to:
 John Grimshaw (soldier) (1893–1980), English recipient of the Victoria Cross
 John Grimshaw (politician) (1842–1917), American businessman and politician
 John Grimshaw (cyclist) (born 1945), voice for cyclists in the UK
 John Atkinson Grimshaw (1836–1893), English artist